The 1905 Michigan Agricultural Aggies football team represented Michigan Agricultural College (MAC) in the 1905 college football season. In their third year under head coach Chester Brewer, the Aggies compiled a 10–2 record and outscored their opponents 349 to 75.

Schedule

References

Michigan Agricultural
 Michigan State Spartans football seasons
Michigan Agricultural Aggies football